The Dark Side of the Moon Live was a worldwide concert tour by Roger Waters, lasting two years. Waters and his band performed the titular album in its entirety at each show, beginning at the Rock in Rio festival on 2 June 2006.

The tour featured elaborate stage design by Mark Fisher (the architect of Pink Floyd's The Wall shows), including giant puppets, large video screen displays and a 360° quadraphonic sound system. The performances were divided into two sets: the first being a collection of Pink Floyd material along with songs from Roger's solo career, and the second The Dark Side of the Moon in its entirety, plus encores.

Pink Floyd's iconic pig has been used extensively during the Dark Side of the Moon tour, introduced on 6 September 2006, the opening night of the US leg, and since appearing at almost every venue. During the tour, the pig has often carried messages critical of the American government, Waters' socialist views, and the support of repressed Latin American populations, including indictments of discrimination and calls for the further prosecution of former dictators. A partial list of the pigs and messages featured at each show can be found at inflatable pigs on Roger Waters' tours.

The Performers
Waters retained much of the backing band from his 1999–2002 In the Flesh tours, including guitarists Snowy White and Andy Fairweather-Low, backing vocalists Katie Kissoon and P.P. Arnold, plus Graham Broad on drums. Guitarist Dave Kilminster, along with Waters and Jon Carin, sang much of the lead vocal parts performed by David Gilmour and Rick Wright on the original Pink Floyd recordings. Andrew Latimer, leader of the progressive rock group Camel was auditioned to be lead guitarist and Gilmour's vocal replacement on the tour, but it was felt his voice could not reach the same high notes, although his guitar playing (often compared to Gilmour's) was exemplary.

Tour band 2006–2007
Roger Waters – Vocals, bass guitar and acoustic guitar
Snowy White – Guitar (former member of Thin Lizzy, played with Pink Floyd in 1977 and 1980).
Dave Kilminster – Guitar, vocals and additional bass (has toured with Keith Emerson and Spinal Tap).
Andy Fairweather-Low – Guitar, bass and backing vocals (has toured and recorded with George Harrison, The Who, Who member Pete Townshend, and Eric Clapton).
Jon Carin – Synthesiser, piano, guitar, lap steel guitar and vocals (has toured with Waters in the past, as well as with the post-Waters Pink Floyd, Floyd guitarist David Gilmour, and The Who).
Harry Waters – Hammond organ, synthesiser (Roger Waters' son).
Carol Kenyon – Backing vocals, percussion, lead vocals on "The Great Gig in the Sky" (session singer who has recorded for Van Morrison and Tears for Fears).
Katie Kissoon – Backing vocals, percussion, lead vocals on "Mother" (backed the likes of Elton John, Clapton, Van Morrison, and many others).
P.P. Arnold – Backing vocals, percussion, lead vocals on "Perfect Sense" (former backing band member for Ike and Tina Turner), backing vocals, percussion. Solo artist, who sang the original version of "First Cut Is The Deepest", and "Angel Of the Morning", produced by Andrew Oldham, Mick Jagger, Mike Hurst, Barry Gibb, Eric Clapton, and Steve Cradock. (Her original touring band "The Nice" was led by Keith Emerson, later toured on their own) backing vocals with Peter Gabriel and many others.
Ian Ritchie – Saxophone, EWI and additional bass
Graham Broad – Drums and percussion (part of former Rolling Stones member Bill Wyman's band The Rhythm Kings).

Most of the touring band for Waters has toured with him and other Pink Floyd members for many years and even recorded with them in a few instances.

Waters' former Pink Floyd bandmate Nick Mason played drums alongside Broad at the 12 June show in Iceland, the 29 June show in Ireland, the 1 July show at Hyde Park in London, the 12 July show in Italy, and the 14 July show in France. During the North American tour, he performed at both Madison Square Garden shows and all three nights at the Hollywood Bowl. On 12 May at Earls Court in London, Mason was introduced on stage to play the second set, the whole of The Dark Side of the Moon and the encores by Waters.

Tour band 2008
A small personnel change was made due to two of the band members having already booked April and May 2008. Chester Kamen replaced Andy Fairweather-Low on guitars, bass and backing vocals. Chester toured with Waters in 2002 during the third year of the In The Flesh tour, back then replacing Doyle Bramhall II. Kamen is the brother of pop singer Nick Kamen. Sylvia Mason-James replaced Katie Kissoon on backing vocals. Mason-James also toured with the Pet Shop Boys. These Roger Waters concerts were the first without Fairweather-Low since 1984, when he replaced Tim Renwick, and the first ever without Kissoon (apart from Wall concert in Berlin in 1990, which utilized the male backing singers from the original tour.)

Roger Waters – Vocals, bass guitar and acoustic guitar
Snowy White – Guitar (former member of Thin Lizzy, played with Pink Floyd in 1977 and 1980).
Dave Kilminster – Guitar, vocals and additional bass (has toured with Keith Emerson and Spinal Tap).
Chester Kamen – Guitar, bass and backing vocals (Toured with Waters in 2002 on the In The Flesh Tour).
Jon Carin – Synthesiser, piano, guitar, lap steel guitar and vocals (has toured with Waters in the past, as well as with the post-Waters Pink Floyd, Floyd guitarist David Gilmour, and The Who).
Harry Waters – Hammond organ, synthesiser (Roger Waters' son).
Carol Kenyon – Backing vocals, percussion, lead vocals on "The Great Gig in the Sky" and "Mother" (session singer who has recorded for Van Morrison and Tears for Fears).
Sylvia Mason-James – Backing vocals, percussion (toured with the Pet Shop Boys)
P.P. Arnold – Backing vocals, percussion, lead vocals on "Perfect Sense" (former backing band member for Ike and Tina Turner.)backing vocals, percussion (former backing band member for Ike and Tina Turner. Solo Artist, who sang the original version of "First Cut Is The Deepest" and "Angel Of the Morning", produced by Andrew Oldham, Mick Jagger, Mike Hurst, Barry Gibb, Eric Clapton, Steve Cradock. Her original touring band ´The Nice´ was led by Keith Emerson, and later toured on their own) backing vocals with Peter Gabriel and so many others.
Ian Ritchie – Saxophone, EWI and additional bass
Graham Broad – Drums and percussion (part of former Rolling Stones member Bill Wyman's band The Rhythm Kings).

Set list
The tour's set list remained constant after 8 June 2006. Earlier shows' sets differed in that they featured "The Gunner's Dream" along with a different running order. A power outage at the 29 June 2006 show forced an early intermission, and so the second set featured "Leaving Beirut" and "Sheep" before The Dark Side of the Moon.

Set one

"In the Flesh"
"Mother"
"Set the Controls for the Heart of the Sun"
"Shine On You Crazy Diamond (Parts II–V)" (abridged)
"Have a Cigar"
"Wish You Were Here"
"Southampton Dock"
"The Fletcher Memorial Home"
"Perfect Sense"
"Leaving Beirut"
"Sheep"

Set two – (The Dark Side of the Moon)

"Speak to Me" / "Breathe"
"On the Run"
"Time" / "Breathe (Reprise)"
"The Great Gig in the Sky"
"Money"
"Us and Them"
"Any Colour You Like"
"Brain Damage"
"Eclipse"

Encore
"The Happiest Days of Our Lives"
"Another Brick in the Wall (Part II)"
"Vera"
"Bring the Boys Back Home"
"Comfortably Numb"

DVD release
According to an interview with Roger's manager, a DVD of the tour is in the works but until it is finished there will be no release date. At different points in 2009–2011, a DVD document was rumoured to be coming soon but to no avail. Not much has been heard since.

Tour images

Tour dates
Waters announced that he would be performing 62 more dates worldwide in 2007. The tour resumed in late January and February with shows in Australia, New Zealand, India, Hong Kong, and China. More shows in South America and Europe, including the UK, followed, with 27 US and Canadian dates in June and July.

On 17 December 2007 it was announced that Roger Waters would play a single one off show in Odense, Denmark 13 May 2008., but on 19 December, only two days later than the first announcement, it was announced he would also play at the Pinkpop Festival in The Netherlands 11 May 2008. On 21 January 2008, a big rumour and a lot of speculation was finally put to rest when it was announced that Roger will also play the annual Coachella Valley Music and Arts Festival in California, on Sunday, 27 April, as the final night's headliner.

On 3 February it was announced that Waters would also play in Denver, Colorado, on 30 April, almost eight years since he last played there, on 3 July 2000, during the In The Flesh tour. Two more US dates were confirmed, Dallas on 2 May and Houston on 4 May, both in the state of Texas, again almost 8 years since he has played in the area. On 20 February, another European date was announced, this time in Granada, Spain, 9 May.

On 26 February, what are supposed to be the last dates of the tour as confirmed by Roger Waters' manager, was announced, two concerts in England, 15 May in Liverpool and 18 May in London. Finally, on 5 March a second London show was announced.

The final show of the tour took place on 6 June at the Palace Square in Saint Petersburg, Russia during White Nights.

(1) - The show of 2 June 2006 as part of Rock in Rio Lisboa

(2) - The show of 10 June 2006 as part of Arrow Rock Festival

(3) - These shows are with Nick Mason

(4) - The show of 14 June 2006 as part of Norwegian Wood

(5) - The show of 29 June 2006 as part of Live at the Marquee

(6) - The show of 1 July 2006 as part of Hyde Park Calling

(7) - The show of 2 July 2006 as part of Roskilde Festival

(8) - The show of 16 July 2006 as part of Moon and Stars Festival

(9) - The show of 7 July 2007 as part of Live Earth

See also
Inflatable pigs on Roger Waters' tours

References

2006 concert tours
2007 concert tours
2008 concert tours
Roger Waters concert tours